Wah is a military cantonment located in the city of Wah in the Punjab province of Pakistan

Wah or WAH may also refer to:
 Wah (city), Pakistan
 Wah!, an English rock band
 Wah! (American band)
 Wa (unit), a Thai length sometimes transliterated as wah
 Szeto Wah, a Hong Kong politician
 WAH Nails, British company founded by Sharmadean Reid
 W.A.H. (album), a mini album by Marie Ueda

See also 
 Wa (disambiguation)
 Wah wah (disambiguation)